

1921
Musiciens aux masques (Three Musicians)
Reading the Letter (La Lecture de la Lettre)

1922
Deux femmes courant sur la plage (La Course)

1923
The Pipes of Pan (La flûte de Pan) - Musée Picasso, Paris
Olga with a Fur Collar
La Lettre (La Réponse)
Los Enamorados ("The Lovers")
Harlequin (Arlequin) - Centre Pompidou, Musée National d'Art Moderne
Mother and Child
Two Nudes
Portrait d'Olga

1924
Still life with a Mandolin - National Gallery of Ireland
Mandolin and Guitar

1925
The Three Dancers (Les Trois Danseuses) - Tate, London

1926 

 Scène d'Intérieur - two versions at University of Michigan Museum of Art

1927
 Seated Woman
Les Trois Amies (The Three Friends) - University of Michigan Museum of Art
Painter Working, observed by a nude model. Plate VIII for Balzac, 'Le Chef-d'oeu - University of Michigan Museum of Art
Bull and Horse. (Taureau et Cheval) Plate III for Balzac, Le Chef-d'oeuvre inco - University of Michigan Museum of Art

1928
The Studio

1929
Woman in a Red Armchair - Menil Collection, Houston

1930
Hand with Bouquet
Seated Bather
Crucifixion

1931
 Figures at the Seashore

References

1921-1930
Picasso 1921-1930